Bukovik is a mountain in central Serbia, above the town of Gornji Milanovac. Its highest peak has an elevation of 851 meters above sea level.

References

Mountains of Serbia